Ardvasar is a village near the southern end of the Sleat peninsula, on the Isle of Skye in Scotland. It is just to the south of the village of Armadale, where a ferry crosses to Mallaig. Nearby attractions include Armadale Castle and the Museum of the Isles.

Gaelic in Ardvasar
The Gaelic name is often translated as the Point of the Executioner, but the element translated as executioner (Bàsar) is obscure. In the first detailed census of the area (1891), 99.0% of residents were recorded as able to speak Gaelic, with 20.2% recorded as mono-lingual Gaelic speakers. In the last census (2011), 26.7% of residents were reported as able to speak Gaelic.

References

External links

 Ardvasar on Gazetteer for Scotland
 Ardvasar on Visit Scotland

Populated places in the Isle of Skye